Max Wright (born 6 April 1998) is an English professional footballer who plays as a winger for FC Halifax Town on loan from EFL League Two side Harrogate Town.

He came through the youth ranks at Grimsby Town before earning a professional contract in 2015. He has also spent time on loan with Sutton Coldfield Town, Scarborough Athletic and Boston United.

Career

Grimsby Town
Wright joined Northern Premier League Premier Division club Sutton Coldfield Town on an initial one-month loan on 12 January 2017. In February 2017, Wright extended his loan at Sutton Coldfield Town until the end of the season. He signed a new one-year contract in August 2017 with Grimsby Town. Wright joined Scarborough Athletic on 24 August 2017 on loan. He signed a new two-year contract with Grimsby on 5 June 2018.

Wright made his professional debut on 14 August 2018 coming on as a substitute in the 83rd minute against Rochdale in the EFL Cup.

On 6 September 2018, Wright joined Boston United on an initial one-month loan. The deal was extended with one further month, so it would end on 6 November 2018.

Wright was recalled from his loan spell by Grimsby Town with immediate effect on 26 April 2019, making his EFL debut on 29 April as a second-half substitute against Notts County.

Grimsby secured promotion with victory in the play-off final, though Wright was not in the matchday squad at London Stadium.

On 11 June 2022, the club announced their retained list ahead of the 2022–23 season and confirmed that Wright would be among those released when his contract expires on 30 June.

Harrogate Town
On 20 July 2022, Wright signed for fellow EFL League Two side Harrogate Town. A week after signing with Harrogate, Wright injured his ankle and was expected to be side-lined for a significant period.He would eventually make his debut on 26 December 2022, coming on as a late substitute in a 3-2 victory against his former team Grimsby Town.

On 29 January 2023, he joined FC Halifax Town on loan.

Career statistics

Honours
Grimsby Town
National League play-off winners: 2022

References

External links
Max Wright profile at the Grimsby Town F.C. website

1998 births
Living people
Footballers from Grimsby
English footballers
Association football wingers
Grimsby Town F.C. players
Sutton Coldfield Town F.C. players
Scarborough Athletic F.C. players
Boston United F.C. players
Harrogate Town A.F.C. players
FC Halifax Town players
English Football League players
Northern Premier League players
National League (English football) players